Frank Uwins (4 January 1915 – 29 September 1991) was  a former Australian rules footballer who played with Richmond in the Victorian Football League (VFL).

Notes

External links 
		

1915 births
1991 deaths
Australian rules footballers from Victoria (Australia)
Richmond Football Club players